A heated bath is used in the laboratory to allow a chemical reaction to occur at an elevated temperature.

The heated bath is a fluid placed in an open (metal) pot. Water and silicone oil are the most commonly used fluids. A water bath is used for temperatures up to 100 °C. An oil bath is employed for temperatures over 100 °C.

The heated bath is heated on a hot plate, or with a Bunsen burner. The reaction chamber (Florence flask, Erlenmeyer flask, or beaker) is immersed in the heated bath. A thermometer is usually kept in the fluid to monitor the temperature.

See also
Bain-marie, a.k.a. double boiler
Heat bath
Laboratory water bath – maintains a constant temperature, for extended time, under a cover
Sand bath

Laboratory equipment